Gordon L. Clark, FBA FAcSS is a geographer and academic. He is currently the Director of the Smith School of Enterprise and the Environment, University of Oxford. with cross appointments in the Saïd Business School and the School of Geography and the Environment. As part of his responsibilities as Director of the Smith School, he is an advisor to companies on issues such as long-term environmental performance. With Towers Watson, he led a team of Oxford academics on a year-long consultation with 25 of the world’s leading investment houses as regards the nature and scope of investment in the context of long-term environmental change. Clark holds a Professorial Fellowship at St Edmund Hall, Oxford., is the Sir Louis Matheson Distinguished Visiting Professor at Monash University's Faculty of Business and Economics and is a Visiting Professor at Stanford University. 
Previous academic appointments have been at Harvard's John F. Kennedy School of Government, the University of Chicago, Carnegie Mellon’s Heinz School and Monash University.

Honours
In 2005, Clark was elected Fellow of the British Academy (FBA)., and in 2014 received an honorary doctorate from the Panteion University of Athens.

References

Australian geographers
Halford Mackinder Professors of Geography
Fellows of the Academy of Social Sciences
Fellows of the Academy of the Social Sciences in Australia
Fellows of the British Academy
Fellows of St Edmund Hall, Oxford
Economic geographers
Living people
Year of birth missing (living people)